Neil Leifer (born December 28, 1942) is an American sports photographer and filmmaker known mainly for his work in the Time Inc. family of magazines.

Early life and education 
Neil Leifer grew up on the Lower East Side of Manhattan in New York City. At the age of thirteen, Leifer was introduced to photography through the Henry Street Settlement House, which offered free classes to the poor children of the neighborhood. Leifer began taking sports pictures, since it combined the two things that he liked. Along with Leifer, the photography group at the Settlement House produced three other photographers: John Iacono, Manny Millan, and Stanley Kubrick.

When he wasn't doing photography as a youth, Leifer had odd jobs, such as shining shoes and delivering sandwiches. Eventually, he saved enough money to buy his first camera.

Career

Early career 
As a boy in New York City, Leifer would gain free admission to New York Giants games by pushing the wheelchairs of handicapped patrons into the stadium. Using his free ticket and a camera, he would then position himself on the field with the photographers. Leifer gained free admission to the December 28, 1958 NFL title game between the Giants and Baltimore Colts. This game became famous as the first overtime game in league history, and is often referred to as the "Greatest Game Ever Played." Leifer, on his sixteenth birthday, caught several images of the game-winning touchdown which he sold to Sports Illustrated. Sports Illustrated's editors liked Leifer's work and he quickly became a boy wonder at the magazine. He had his first cover shot in 1962 at age 19.

Sports Illustrated 

Leifer was also known for taking risks. For the 1966 heavyweight title fight between Cleveland Williams and Muhammad Ali, he placed a camera in the rafters of the Houston Astrodome to get a shot of the canvas when the victor knocked out his competition. It has been said that it is the only photo Neil Leifer took himself that is hanging in his house, also he regards this as his favorite photograph from a 40-year professional career. His shot of Ali and a defeated Williams has been seen by millions and was voted the greatest sport photo ever by The Observer.

A year earlier, Leifer was one of the only two photographers with color film in his camera when Ali knocked out Sonny Liston in Lewiston, Maine, and his image of the moment has become not just one of his most famous photos, but one of the most memorable sports photos of all time – seen by many as the greatest sports photograph in history.

Another demanding technique, Leifer frequently used strip photography in the 1970s for athletes including Gaylord Perry and Billy Kidd, and for sports such as IndyCar racing.

Leifer photographed seven Olympic Games for the magazine and is best known for having followed Muhammad Ali's career from beginning to end. 170 of his pictures have been published on the cover of Sports Illustrated.

Time Magazine 

In 1978, Leifer left sports for a wider range of assignments with Time Magazine and produced 40 covers for the magazine. His cover subjects have included, President Ronald Reagan and Vice President George Bush, Alabama football coach Bear Bryant, National Rifle Association President Joe Foss, Statue of Liberty's 100th birthday celebration, actors Burt Reynolds and Clint Eastwood, Pope John Paul II's visit to America, Heavyweight Champion Mike Tyson, New York City Mayor Ed Koch, The Space Shuttle Columbia, President Jimmy Carter, The Animals of Africa, Olympian Carl Lewis, and actor Paul Newman.

In 1992, Leifer covered both the Winter Olympic Games in Albertville, France and the Summer Olympic Games in Barcelona, Spain. The 2000 Summer Olympic Games in Sydney, Australia was the fifteenth Olympic Games he has covered.

In later years, Leifer gradually reduced his photography workload, turning his attention to films, although he has been known to come out of retirement for a special cover shoot for Sports Illustrated on rare occasions.

Filmmaker and documentarian 
In recent years, Leifer has focused his creativity to the moving image. He is the director, producer and often writer, of noteworthy film including features, shorts, and documentaries.

In 2007, Leifer was shortlisted for the documentary film short Oscar for "Portraits of a Lady" which he directed, and co-produced with Walter Bernard.

Books 

The Best of Leifer (2001) is a retrospective of Leifer's 40 years as a photojournalist and showcases the best of his sports and non-sports photographs. Neil Leifer, Ballet in the Dirt: The Golden Age of Baseball (2007) is a collection of Leifer’s baseball photographs of the 1960s and 1970s, the “Golden Age of Baseball”. Guts and Glory: The Golden Age of American Football 1958–1978 (2008) is a collection of Leifer’s football photographs of the late 1950s, 1960s and 1970s. In Relentless: The Stories behind the Photographs (2016) Leifer gives a behind the scenes look at the stories behind fifty of his most iconic pictures.

1969 Dreadnought Returns Baum, Printing House
1970 Dreadnought Farewell, Kaye
1976 The Mark Spitz Complete Book of Swimming Crowell
1979 Sports Abrams
1985 Neil Leifer’s Sports Stars, Doubleday
1987 US Naval Airpower – Supercarrier in Action, Motorbooks
1988 USS New Jersey – The Navy's Big Guns: From Mothballs to Vietnam, Motorbooks
1988 USS New Jersey – World War II To The Persian Gulf, Motorbooks
1991 Muhammad Ali – Memories, Rizzoli
1992 Safari, Reader's Digest
1992 Sports, HarperCollins
2001 The Best of Leifer, Abbeville
2003 Neil Leifer: Portraits (with an introduction by Tom Brokaw), St. Ann's
2004 G.O.A.T. (Leifer was one of 2 principal photographers), Taschen
2006 A Year in Sports (with an introduction by Frank Deford), Abbeville
2007 Neil Leifer, Ballet in the Dirt: The Golden Age of Baseball (with an introduction by Ron Shelton), Taschen *2008 Neil Leifer, Guts and Glory: The Golden Age of American Football, 1958–1979 (with an introduction by Jim Murray), Taschen
2016 Relentless: The Stories behind the Photographs, University of Texas Press

The Neil Leifer Picture Collection 

The Neil Leifer Picture Collection contains photographs, B&W and color, taken over the last 45 years (mainly in the 1960s, 1970s and 1980s) of most of the major sporting events throughout the world.

References

Further reading
 Gabriel Schechter and Ron Shelton, ed. Eric Kroll; Neil Leifer: Ballet in the Dirt: Baseball photography of the 1960s and 70s (Taschen 2007)
 George Plimpton; The Best of Leifer (Abbeville Publishing Group (Abbeville Press, Inc.) 2001)
 contributor Tom Brokaw; Neil Leifer: Portraits (St. Ann's Press 2003)}

1942 births
American photojournalists
Sports photographers
Living people
Journalists from New York City
People from the Lower East Side